Melquíades Álvarez Gónzalez-Posada (Gijón, May 17, 1864 - Madrid, August 22, 1936) was a Spanish Republican politician, founder and leader of the Reformist Republican Party (Partido Republicano Reformista), commonly known just as Reformist Party and President of the Congress of Deputies between 1922 and 1923.

Biography

He studied Law at the University of Oviedo (Asturias) and collaborated with Asturian liberal newspapers. He was friend of the famous writer Clarín and he started working as a lawyer in Oviedo.

In 1898 he was elected to the Congress as Liberal candidate and was appointed Professor of Roman Law at the University of Oviedo. In 1899, he turned into Republican and in 1906 he was elected Republican congressman. He was one of the organizers of the Liberal Block in 1908 against the Conservative Prime Minister Antonio Maura and of the Republican-Socialist Conjunction in 1909. In 1912, he founded with Gumersindo de Azcárate and José Ortega y Gasset the Reformist Party and the League for the Spanish Political Education. In the 1914 elections, 11 Reformist congressmen were elected. It had also a great success in the municipal elections in Asturias. During the Second Republic he founded the Democratic Liberal Republican Party (Partido Republicano Liberal Democrático), but its electoral results were poor: two deputies in 1932 and ten in 1933, when they supported the right-wing government backed by the Spanish Confederation of the Autonomous Right (CEDA).

After the beginning of the Civil War, anarchist militias imprisoned and killed him in the Cárcel Modelo.  Following the murder of Alvarez together with other political prisoners, President Azaña is said to have cried; Indalecio Prieto predicted the fall of the Republican government: "with this brutality we have lost the war".

Among the various efforts and commitments that Melquíades Álvarez developed or launched throughout his life, the creation in Asturias of athenæums and popular libraries can be highlighted, following the spirit and example proposed by different pedagogues to make "education available to workers". Melquiades has different named streets in Oviedo, Gijón, La Felguera, Madrid, Leganés  and Tomelloso.

In the few decades up to 2021, over twenty books and academic studies were published about Álvarez's political life.

References

Bibliography

Álvarez, Melquíades: Antología de discursos (prepared by José Girón Garrote), Oviedo: Real Instituto de Estudios Asturianos, 2000
Añigo, Luis: "Melquíades Álvarez, ¿eterno equivocado?", Cuadernos Republicanos, 37 (1999), pp. 85–100
García Venero, Maximiano: Melquíades Álvarez: historia de un liberal, Madrid: Tebas, 1974 (2nd edition)
Íñigo, Luis: Melquíades Álvarez: un liberal en la Segunda República, Oviedo: Real Instituto de Estudios Asturianos, 2000
 
Suárez, Manuel: "Melquíades Álvarez y la democracia liberal en España", in Moreno, Javier (coord.): Progresistas: biografías de reformistas españoles, Madrid: Taurus, 2006, pp. 233–270

1864 births
1936 deaths
People from Gijón
Liberal Party (Spain, 1880) politicians
Reformist Party (Spain) politicians
Members of the Congress of Deputies of the Spanish Restoration
Members of the Congress of Deputies of the Second Spanish Republic
Politicians from Asturias
University of Oviedo alumni
Academic staff of the University of Oviedo
Executed Spanish people
People killed by the Second Spanish Republic
Presidents of the Congress of Deputies (Spain)